Universidad Rural is a private, secular university in Guatemala.

External links
Official site

See also
 List of universities in Guatemala

References

Universities in Guatemala City